Lathe Joshi is a 2016 Marathi-language drama film directed by Mangesh Joshi and produced by Amol Kagne, Mangesh Joshi , Sonali Joshi and Laxman Kagne.

Cast 
 Chittaranjan Giri as Lathe Joshi
 Ashwini Giri
 Seva Chouhan
 Om Bhutkar
 Gouri Konge

Plot 

Joshi, known as Lathe Joshi for his skilled work on lathe machine, is left without a job when the owner of the workshop has to close the business due to advances in automation.

Soundtrack

Track listing

Awards

 South Asia International Film Festival, Singapore.
 Kazan International Film Festival, Russia.
 Bengalore International Film Festival, 2017.
 Pune International Film Festival, 2017.

References

External links
 

Indian drama films
2010s Marathi-language films
2016 films
2016 drama films